The Basilica di San Lorenzo (Basilica of St. Lawrence) is one of the largest churches of Florence, Italy, situated at the centre of the main market district of the city, and it is the burial place of all the principal members of the Medici family from Cosimo il Vecchio to Cosimo III. It is one of several churches that claim to be the oldest in Florence, having been consecrated in 393 AD, at which time it stood outside the city walls. For three hundred years it was the city's cathedral, before the official seat of the bishop was transferred to Santa Reparata. 

San Lorenzo was the parish church of the Medici family. In 1419, Giovanni di Bicci de' Medici offered to finance a new church to replace an eleventh-century Romanesque rebuilding. Filippo Brunelleschi, the leading Renaissance architect of the first half of the fifteenth century, was commissioned to design it, but the building, with alterations, was not completed until after his death. The church is part of a larger monastic complex that contains other important architectural and artistic works: the Old Sacristy by Brunelleschi and having interior decoration and sculpture by Donatello; the Laurentian Library by Michelangelo; the New Sacristy based on Michelangelo's designs; and the Medici Chapels by Matteo Nigetti.

History 

The Basilica of San Lorenzo is considered a milestone in the development of Renaissance architecture. The basilica has a complicated building history. The project was begun around 1419, under the direction of Filippo Brunelleschi. Lack of funds slowed the construction and forced changes to the original design. By the early 1440s, only its sacristy (now called the Old Sacristy) had been worked on because that was being paid for by the Medici. In 1442, the Medici stepped in to take over financial responsibility of the church as well. After Brunelleschi's death in 1446, the job was handed either to Antonio Manetti or Michelozzo; scholars are uncertain which. Although the building was largely completed by 1459 in time for a visit to Florence by Pius II, the chapels along the right-hand aisles were still under construction during the 1480s and 1490s.

By the time the building was completed, aspects of its layout and detailing no longer corresponded to the original plan. The principal difference is that Brunelleschi had envisioned the chapels along the side aisles to be deeper than those built and he intended them to resemble the chapels in the transept, the only part of the building that is known to have been completed as Brunelleschi designed it.

The building in Renaissance architecture 

 
The Basilica of San Lorenzo demonstrates many innovative features of the developing style of Renaissance architecture, 
a simple mathematical proportional relationship using the square aisle bay as a module and the nave bays in a 2x1 ratio 
the use of an integrated system of column, arches, and entablatures, based on Roman Classical models
the use of Classical proportions for the height of the columns
a clear relationship between column and pilaster, the latter meant to be read as a type of embedded pier
the use of spherical segments in the vaults of the side aisles
the articulation of the structure in pietra serena (Italian: “serene stone”)

According to one scholar, features such as the interior's Corinthian arcades and ceiling's flat panels mark "a departure from the Gothic and a return to the Romanesque Proto-Renaissance."

At times, the design of San Lorenzo has met with criticism, particularly when compared with Santo Spirito, also in Florence and which is considered to have been constructed more or less in conformity with Brunelleschi's ideas, even though he died before most of it was built. By the sixteenth century, Giorgio Vasari commented that along the nave, the columns should have been elevated on plinths. The steps along the aisles, supporting the pilasters, also have been considered to deviate from Classical ideals.

Outer and inner façades 

The Medici Pope Leo X gave Michelangelo the commission to design an outer façade of the basilica in white Carrara marble in 1518. Michelangelo made a large wooden model that shows how he adjusted the classical proportions of the facade, drawn to scale, after the ideal proportions of the human body, to the greater height of the nave. 
Although the outer facade of the basilica remained unbuilt, Michelangelo's large wooden model of it remains. 

Michelangelo did design and build the internal facade of the basilica that is seen from the nave looking back toward the entrances. It comprises three doors between two pilasters with garlands of oak and laurel and a balcony on two Corinthian columns.

In recent years, the association of "Friends of the Elettrice Palatina" and the Comune of Florence re-visited the question of completing the outer facade of the basilica according to Michelangelo's designs.  To assist with the public debate, a computerized reconstruction was projected onto the plain brick facade in February 2007. As yet, no decision has been made regarding a project use Michelangelo's design to build the outer facade following his wooden model.

The campanile dates from 1740.

Old Sacristy 

Opening off the south transept of the basilica is the square, domed space, the Sagrestia Vecchia, or Old Sacristy, that was designed by Brunelleschi (1377–1446) and that is the oldest part of the present church and the only part completed in Brunelleschi's lifetime. It contains the tombs of several members of the Medici family. It was composed of a sphere on top of a cube; the cube acting as the human world and the sphere as the heavens.

New Sacristy 

Opposite the Old Sacristy in the north transept of the basilica is the Sagrestia Nuova (New Sacristy), begun in 1520 by Michelangelo, who also designed the Medici tombs within it. That the architect of a building also designed the interior furnishings is a historical novelty in European architecture that is driven by his being a sculptor by training. The new sacristy was composed of three registers, the topmost topped by a coffered pendentive dome. The articulation of the interior walls may be described as early examples of Renaissance Mannerism (see Michelangelo's Ricetto in the Laurentian Library). The combination of pietra serena pilasters on the lower register is carried through to the second register; however, in Mannerist fashion, architectural elements 'seem impossible', creating suspense and tension that is evident in this example. 

Michelangelo completed most of the statuary for the new sacristy as well, however, the statues of the two patron saints planned to accompany the Madonna and Child that were planned for placement on the main wall and the sculptural elements of the two sarcophagi were left undone when he was redirected to another project by the pope, the political situation in Florence changed, and changes later occurred in papal succession. Although the new sacristy was vaulted over by 1524, these circumstances, the temporary exile of the Medici (1527), the death of Giulio, eventually Pope Clement VII, and the permanent departure of Michelangelo for Rome in 1534, meant that Michelangelo never finished the project and he refused to direct completion. 

The statues that Michelangelo had carved by the time of his departure had not been put in place and were left in disarray within the chapel. In 1545, they were installed by Niccolò Tribolo. By order of Cosimo I, the remaining work was completed by 1555 by Giorgio Vasari and Bartolomeo Ammannati.

In a statement in a biography of Michelangelo that was published in 1553 by his disciple, Ascanio Condivi, and reportedly is based largely on Michelangelo's own recollections, Condivi gives the following description of the sculptures that were planned for the sarcophagi:

The statues are four in number, placed in a sacristy... the sarcophagi are placed before the side walls, and on the lids of each there recline two big figures, larger than life, to wit, a man and a woman; they signify Day and Night and, in conjunction, Time which devours all things... And in order to signify Time he planned to make a mouse, having left a bit of marble upon the work (which [plan] he subsequently did not carry out because he was prevented by circumstances), because this little animal ceaselessly gnaws and consumes just as time devours everything.

Concealed corridor discovered 

In 1976, a concealed corridor with drawings by Michelangelo on its walls was discovered under the New Sacristy.

Cappelle Medicee 

The most celebrated and grandest part of San Lorenzo is the Cappelle Medicee (Medici Chapels) in the apse. The Medici were still paying for it when, in 1743, the last living member of the family, Anna Maria Luisa de' Medici, died. In 1742, she had commissioned Vincenzo Meucci to paint the Glory of Florentine Saints, a fresco, inside the cupola. Approximately fifty lesser members of the Medici family are buried in the crypt. The final design (1603–1604) was by Bernardo Buontalenti, based on models of Alessandro Pieroni and Matteo Nigetti. Above is the Cappella dei Principi (Chapel of the Princes), a great but awkwardly domed octagonal hall where the grand dukes are buried. The style shows Mannerist eccentricities in its unusual shape, broken cornices, and asymmetrically sized windows. In the interior, the ambitious decoration with colored marbles overwhelms the attempts at novel design. Its centre was supposed to feature the Holy Sepulchre, moved from Jerusalem, although attempts to buy and, failing that, to steal it failed.Ref.?

Cappella Corbelli 

The Corbelli chapel, in the southern transept, contains a monument by the sculptor Giovanni Dupre to the wife of Count Moltke-Hvitfeldt, formerly Danish ambassador to the Court of Naples.

Works of art 

Bronzino – The Martyrdom of St Lawrence, fresco, north aisle
Desiderio da Settignano – Pala del Sacramento, tabernacle, south aisle
Donatello – two pulpits, (his last works); bronze and marble, nave 
Donatello – frieze, reliefs, tondi, and bronze doors, (Sagrestia Vecchia)
Rosso Fiorentino – Marriage of the Virgin, oil on canvas, in one of the south aisle chapels
Fra Filippo Lippi – Annunciation, altarpiece, north transept chapel
Michelangelo – Madonna and Child, main wall of new sacristy and statues among the two tombs on the side walls of the new sacristy (Sagrestis Nuova)
Antonio del Pollaiuolo – Crucifix, wood, south transept chapel
Verrocchio – Tomb of Giovanni and Piero de Medici, bronze, marble, (Sagrestia Vecchia)

Funerary monuments 

Bernardo Cennini (goldsmith and printer) (south transept)
Donatello (north transept)
Francesco Landini (south aisle)
Niccolò Martelli (north transept)
Cosimo de' Medici (in front of the high altar)
Cosimo I de' Medici (Cappella dei Principi)
Cosimo II de' Medici (Cappella dei Principi)
Cosimo III de' Medici (Cappella dei Principi)
Ferdinando I de' Medici (Cappella dei Principi)
Ferdinando II de' Medici (Cappella dei Principi)
Ferdinando III de' Medici (crypt)
Francesco I de' Medici (Cappella dei Principi)
Giovanni di Bicci de' Medici (Sagrestia Vecchia)
Giovanni di Cosimo de' Medici (Sagrestia Vecchia)
Giuliano di Lorenzo de' Medici (Sagrestia Nuova)
Giuliano di Piero de' Medici (Sagrestia Nuova)
Lorenzo I de' Medici (Sagrestia Nuova)
Lorenzo II de' Medici (Sagrestia Nuova)
Piero di Cosimo de' Medici (Sagrestia Vecchia)
Nicolas Steno

See also 

Medici Chapel
History of medieval Arabic and Western European domes
History of Italian Renaissance domes
History of early modern period domes

References

Notes

Further reading 

Balas, Edith (1995). Michelangelo's Medici Chapel: a New Interpretation, American Philosophical Society, Philadelphia
Barenboim, Peter (2006). Michelangelo Drawings: Key to the Medici Chapel Interpretation, Moscow, Letny Sad. 
Barenboim, Peter, Sergey Shiyan (2006). Michelangelo: Mysteries of Medici Chapel, SLOVO, Moscow, 2006. 
Barenboim, Peter with Arthur Heath (2019). 500 Years of the New Sacristy: Michelangelo in the Medici Chapel, LOOM, Moscow. 
Beck, James, Antonio Paolucci, Bruno Santi (2000). Michelangelo: The Medici Chapel, Thames & Hudson, London and New York

Vasari, Giorgio. "Filippo di ser Brunelesco", in: Lives of the Most Eminent Painters, Sculptors & Architects, transl. by Gaston du C. de Vere, Macmillan and & The Medici Society, London, 1912–15, archieved online as part of Internet Medieval Sourcebook by Fordham University, New York

External links 

 Opera Medicea Laurenziana
 visualization of the facade for San Lorenzo in Florence designed by Michelangelo

Roman Catholic churches completed in 1459
Lorenzo
Filippo Brunelleschi church buildings
Michelangelo church buildings
Renaissance architecture in Florence
15th-century Roman Catholic church buildings in Italy
 
Burial sites of the House of Medici